The San Sebastián International Film Festival ( SSIFF;) is an annual FIAPF A category film festival held in the Spanish city of Donostia-San Sebastián in September, in the Basque Country.

Since its creation in 1953 it has established itself as one of the 14 "A" category competitive festivals accredited by the FIAPF, of which it has one of the lowest budgets. It has hosted several important events of the history of cinema, such as the international premieres of Vertigo, by Alfred Hitchcock (who attended the Festival) and the European premiere of Star Wars. It was the first festival attended by Roman Polanski and has helped advance the professional careers of filmmakers such as Francis Ford Coppola, Bong Joon-ho and Pedro Almodóvar.

José Luis Rebordinos has served as the director of the festival since 2011.

History
The festival was founded in 1953 with the first festival starting on September 21, 1953. Although it was originally intended to honour Spanish language films, films of other languages became eligible for consideration in 1955, when the festival was specialized in color films. It has been acknowledged by the FIAPF as an A category festival since 1957, with the exception of the 1980–1984 period, when no major awards were given.

Many important moments of the history of cinema have taken place in the festival, such as the European premiere of Star Wars, the international premiere of Vertigo, presented by Alfred Hitchcock, and the Roman Polanski’s first attendance at a film festival.

Sections

These are the main sections of the festival:
Official Selection: a selection of recent full-length cinematographic works, which have not previously screened in other festivals (except FIAPF-regulated non-competitive festivals and national competitions at festivals in their countries of production), compete for the major awards. Spanish-produced films in competition must be world premieres. Some films are included out of competition. 
New Directors: First or second movies of new talents.
Horizontes Latinos: A selection of films from Latin America, unreleased in Spain.
Pearls: A selection of the best movies screened at other international festivals throughout the year.
Zabaltegi – Tabakalera: A competitive section aiming for heterogeneity with no formal norms. 
Made in Spain: A showcase of the year's Spanish movies for their international launch.
Zinemira: A showcase of movies produced or directed by Basques.
Retrospectives: Retrospectives are included in the program to present the works of a renowned filmmaker or works that represent a particular theme.
Culinary Cinema: A non-competitive selection of gastronomy-related films.
Velodrome: Projections of movies for a big audience in a giant screen installed at the Velódromo de Anoeta.
Nest Film Students: Selected shorts, mostly graduation projects, from film schools around the world.

Awards
An international jury evaluates the films in the Official Selection and awards the following prizes:
Golden Shell for Best Film
Special Jury Prize
Silver Shell for Best Leading Performance (since 2021)
Silver Shell for Best Supporting Performance (since 2021)
Silver Shell for Best Director
Jury Prize for Best Cinematography
Jury Prize for Best Screenplay
Donostia Award

Former awards include:
Silver Shell for Best Actress (1953–2020) (replaced by Best Leading Performance and Best Supporting Performance)
Silver Shell for Best Actor (1953–2020) (replaced by Best Leading Performance and Best Supporting Performance)

The following are the main awards for films in the parallel sections:
 New Directors Award: decided by a special jury, the films in the New Directors section compete for this prize.
 Audience Award: The audience chooses a film from among those in the Pearls section.
 Youth Award: A jury composed of 350 youngsters aged between 17 and 21 chooses a film from those competing for the "New Directors Award".
 Horizontes Award: A specific jury chooses the best film in the Horizontes Latinos section.
 "Otra Mirada" Award: TVE gives the Another Look award to the film, from any section, that best reflects the female world.
 Sebastiane Award: a jury chooses the film, from any section, that best reflects the values and reality of lesbians, gays, bisexuals and transgender people.

References

External links

 
 San Sebastián International Film Festival at the Internet Movie Database

 
Film festivals established in 1953
Film festivals in Spain
Festivals in San Sebastián
Actors
1953 establishments in Spain
September events